Paul L. Stovall (August 16, 1948 – January 9, 1978) was an American basketball small forward in the National Basketball Association (NBA) for the Phoenix Suns. He also was a member of the San Diego Conquistadors in the American Basketball Association (ABA).He was recruited and played basketball for Pratt Community Junior College  straight out of prison. He played college basketball at Arizona State University.

Early years
Stovall experience a troubled youth, being in jail at the Kansas State Industrial Reformatory in Hutchinson after being convicted for a series of crimes, before even attending high school. It was while serving time, that he developed physically and as a basketball player. He was a part of the prison basketball team that toured small towns throughout Kansas between 1966 and 1967. On one occasion, the team competed against Pratt Community College, where head coach Jim Douglas had a chance to scout him. 

He attended Wichita North High School briefly because of his problems with the law, forcing him to earn his diploma through correspondence while in prison.

College career
Stovall enrolled at Pratt Community College. He appeared in 58 games, averaging 30.3 points for a total of 1,758 points and also registered 22.2 rebounds per game for a total of 1,288 rebounds, while finishing as the eighth-leading scorer and second-leading rebounder in junior-college basketball history.

He transferred to Arizona State University at the end of his sophomore season. As a senior, he averaged 21.8 points (seventh in school history). He scored a career high against the University of New Mexico. He posted a career high 21 rebounds against the University of Utah.

Stovall averaged 19 points and 12.4 rebounds in two seasons. He led his teams in scoring, rebounding and field goal percentage during both seasons. He graduated ranked first all-time among two-year players in school history in scoring average (19 points), rebounding average (12.4) and total rebounds (647). 

In 2006, he was inducted into the Arizona State University Sports Hall of Fame. In 2013, he was inducted into the Wichita Sports Hall of Fame.

Professional career

Phoenix Suns
Stovall was selected by the Los Angeles Lakers in the 2nd round (22nd overall) of the 1972 NBA Draft. On September 19, 1972, he was traded to the Phoenix Suns, in exchange for a 1974 2nd round draft pick (#22-Truck Robinson) and a future draft choice.

Stovall appeared in 25 games. On September 14, 1973, he was waived by the Phoenix Suns.

San Diego Conquistadors
In 1973, he signed with the San Diego Conquistadors in the American Basketball Association. He appeared in 13 games.

He averaged 4.6 points per game in his career, competing for the Phoenix Suns and San Diego Conquistadors.

Personal life
In January 1978, he died in a motorcycle accident at the age of 29, while driving in a rainstorm.

Notes

1948 births
1978 deaths
American men's basketball players
Arizona State Sun Devils men's basketball players
Basketball players from Kansas
Pratt Beavers men's basketball players
Los Angeles Lakers draft picks
Motorcycle road incident deaths
Phoenix Suns players
Road incident deaths in California
San Diego Conquistadors players
Small forwards